The Women's relay of the Biathlon World Championships 2011 was held on March 13, 2011 at 15:00 with the participation of 20 nations.

Results

References

Biathlon World Championships 2011
2011 in Russian women's sport